Al-Kawthar TV is a Tehran-based Arabic-language television channel. Launched in 2006 by Islamic Republic of Iran Broadcasting, it broadcasts religious and cultural programs about 20 hours a day mainly for Arab audience in the Middle East and North Africa. The content of the programs is mainly about promoting Shia Islam. The TV station derives its name from the heavenly river, Al-Kawthar. Al-Kawthar TV (alkawthartv[.]com) is blocked in the US and brought down from the FBI, getting the message 'This website has been seized' if you enter the site.

See also 
 Al-Alam News Network
 Al-Ahvaz TV

References

External links

Al-Kawthar TV in Instagram

2006 establishments in Iran
Arab mass media
Arabic-language television stations
Islamic Republic of Iran Broadcasting
Television channels and stations established in 2006
Mass media in Tehran
Television stations in Iran
Shia media